Long-distance motorcyclists with Wikipedia articles, with tours in chronological order.

List of motorcycle riders and tours

References

Further reading
 

Long-distance motorcycle riders